Major Reynold Alleyne Clement (3 March 1834 – 2 October 1905) was an English cricketer who played in three first-class matches. He was a member of Queen Victoria's personal bodyguard, and was also Clerk of the Course at Ascot Racecourse from 1884 until his death in 1905.

Career

Early life
Reynold Alleyne Clement was born in Barbados in 1834. He was the son of Hampden Clement (1808 – 1880) – who was an English landowner who had been educated at Exeter College, Oxford – and of Philippa Cobham Alleyne. His paternal grandfather was Richard Clement (1754 – 1829), who was a Dutch owner of sugar plantations whose English residence was 13 Bolton Street, Mayfair. Reynold was the nephew of Martha Clement, who was the wife of Colonel Thomas Moody, Kt., who named a son, Hampden Clement Blamire Moody, after Reynold Clement's father, and through whom he was related to Major-General Richard Clement Moody, who was the founder and the first Lieutenant-Governor of British Columbia. Reynold was named after his maternal grandfather, Sir Reynold Abel Alleyne, 2nd Baronet (1789 – 1870) of Barbados. Reynold Clement had three siblings: Rosalie, Richard, and Helena.

Reynold Clement was raised in England at No. 23 and No. 20 Wilton Crescent, Belgravia, and at Snarestone Lodge, Snarestone, Leicestershire. He was educated at Rugby School and at Trinity College, Cambridge, at which he matriculated in 1853. At Cambridge, as a consequence of the abolitionist sympathies of many of the undergraduates, Reynold stated that he had been born at Snarestone Lodge, Leicestershire, although his actual birthplace was Barbados.

Cricket
He played cricket as a middle-order batsman both at Rugby School and at Cambridge University: in 1854 he was selected for the University Match against Oxford University, although he failed to score in either innings. He played for Cambridge only in the 1854 season. There is no record that he graduated from Cambridge University. By 1857, he was appearing in a minor match for a United Ireland eleven, and in 1863 his last first-class match was for the Marylebone Cricket Club. Reynold's elder brother, Richard, played cricket for Oxford University and appeared in the 1853 University Match.

Army
After Cambridge, Clement joined the 68th Regiment and served during the 1860s in the New Zealand Wars, in which he attained the rank of Major. In 1876, he was a member of Queen Victoria's personal bodyguard.

Ascot Racecourse
He was appointed secretary to the Board of Trustees of Ascot Racecourse in 1881, and Clerk of the Course at the same in 1885, as which he made 'vast improvements' to the course and the stands.

Marriage and family
Reynold married Louisa Cecilia Blackwood, daughter of Henry Martin Blackwood and Harriet Louisa Bulkeley, and granddaughter of Vice-Admiral Henry Blackwood, in 1867. They had four children, including Sydney Reynold Clement, who moved to Australia in 1911 and was killed in action at Anzac Cove on 25 April 1915. Reynold died in 1905.

References

External links
 

1834 births
1905 deaths
English cricketers
Cambridge University cricketers
Marylebone Cricket Club cricketers
People educated at Rugby School
Alumni of Trinity College, Cambridge
Horse racing in Great Britain
Colony of Barbados people